Straumnes is a village in the municipality of Vågan in Nordland county, Norway.  It is located just east of the village of Laukvika along the Vesterålsfjorden (a part of the Norwegian Sea) on the northwestern side of the island of Austvågøya in the Lofoten archipelago.  Strandlandet Church is located in this village.

References

Vågan
Villages in Nordland